Redfish is a common name for several species of fish. It is most commonly applied to certain deep-sea rockfish in the genus Sebastes, red drum from the genus Sciaenops or the reef dwelling snappers in the genus Lutjanus. It is also applied to the slimeheads or roughies (family Trachichthyidae), and the alfonsinos (Berycidae).

References

Fish common names